Emmetsburg is a city in Palo Alto County, Iowa, United States. The population was 3,706 at the time of the 2020 census. It is the county seat of Palo Alto County. Emmetsburg is located around the southern bay of Five Island Lake.

History
The town was originally settled by immigrants during the Great Famine of Ireland between 1845 and 1852. Emmetsburg was named after the Dublin-born Irish nationalist Robert Emmet, who was executed at 25 for leading an 1803 rebellion against the British. The city was incorporated on November 17, 1877.

Geography

The city lies just to the east of the Des Moines River.

Climate

According to the Köppen Climate Classification system, Emmetsburg has a hot-summer humid continental climate, abbreviated "Dfa" on climate maps.

Demographics

2010 census
As of the census of 2010, there were 3,904 people, 1,632 households, and 967 families living in the city. The racial makeup of the city was 96.9% White, 1.0% African American, 0.2% Native American, 0.5% Asian, 0.3% from other races, and 1.1% from two or more races. Hispanic or Latino of any race were 2.0% of the population.

There were 1,632 households, of which 24.9% had children under the age of 18 living with them, 47.0% were married couples living together, 8.8% had a female householder with no husband present, 3.4% had a male householder with no wife present, and 40.7% were non-families. 34.3% of all households were made up of individuals, and 15.7% had someone living alone who was 65 years of age or older. The average household size was 2.22 and the average family size was 2.80.

The median age in the city was 41.4 years. 20.2% of residents were under the age of 18; 12.9% were between the ages of 18 and 24; 19.9% were from 25 to 44; 25.5% were from 45 to 64; and 21.6% were 65 years of age or older. The gender makeup of the city was 48.3% male and 51.7% female.

2000 census
As of the census of 2000, there were 3,958 people, 1,620 households, and 941 families living in the city. The racial makeup of the city was 98.59% White, 0.08% African American, 0.18% Native American, 0.53% Asian, 0.13% from other races, and 0.51% from two or more races. Hispanic or Latino of any race were 0.83% of the population.

There were 1,620 households, out of which 24.9% had children under the age of 18 living with them, 49.1% were married couples living together, 6.9% had a female householder with no husband present, and 41.9% were non-families. 34.8% of all households were made up of individuals, and 18.0% had someone living alone who was 65 years of age or older. The average household size was 2.24 and the average family size was 2.90.

Age spread: 20.5% under the age of 18, 13.9% from 18 to 24, 21.6% from 25 to 44, 21.2% from 45 to 64, and 22.7% who were 65 years of age or older. The median age was 41 years. For every 100 females, there were 92.1 males. For every 100 females age 18 and over, there were 85.4 males.

The median income for a household in the city was $31,520, and the median income for a family was $44,554. Males had a median income of $29,830 versus $20,800 for females. The per capita income for the city was $17,599. About 6.9% of families and 13.1% of the population were below the poverty line, including 18.0% of those under age 18 and 9.3% of those age 65 or over.

Education
Emmetsburg Community School District operates public schools.

Sports
Emmetsburg hosted minor league baseball in 1912. The Emmetsburg team played as members of the Iowa State League, with home games played at Harrison Park.

Notable people

Paul Emerick, USA international rugby player; born in Emmetsburg
Matthew M. Joyce, former United States federal judge; born in Emmetsburg.
Loren Meyer, retired American professional basketball player; born in Emmetsburg.
Bruce Nelson, retired National Football League player; born in Emmetsburg
Robert W. Pratt, District Judge for the United States District Court for the Southern District of Iowa; born in Emmetsburg
Curt Pringle, former mayor of Anaheim, California and Speaker of the California State Assembly; born in Emmetsburg
Thomas Appelquist, theoretical physicist and dean of the Graduate School, Yale University; born in Emmetsburg

References

External links

City of Emmetsburg, Iowa Website Portal style website, Government, Business, Library, Recreation and more
City-Data Comprehensive Statistical Data and more about Emmetsburg

Cities in Iowa
Cities in Palo Alto County, Iowa
County seats in Iowa